Raheja is an Indian surname. Notable people with the surname include:

Lachmandas S. Raheja, Founder of K. Raheja Group of Companies 
Chandru Raheja (born 1941), Indian billionaire businessman
Dinesh Raheja (born 1957), Indian author, columnist, TV scriptwriter, film historian
Gloria Goodwin Raheja, American anthropologist
Mishal Raheja, Indian television actor
Tushar Raheja (born 1984), Indian storyteller and researcher

Indian surnames